Tatiana Nikolaevna Nikonova (Russian: Татья́на Никола́евна Ни́конова) (4 February 1978 – 12 May 2021) – Russian feminist, journalist, blogger, and sex educator. Nikonova was the creator, first owner and editor-in-chief of Spletnik.ru, one of the first sites with news and gossips about celebrities. Tatiana Nikonova was one of the first public sex educators in the Russia. Since 2001, she promoted the need of sex education for teenagers.

Nikonova was divorced.

References 

1978 births
2021 deaths
Russian feminists
Russian journalists
People from Troitsko-Pechorsky District
Place of death missing